Resapamea passer, the dock rustic moth, is a moth in the family Noctuidae. It is found from central Alberta to northern Arizona in the Rocky Mountain region. In the mid-Continent it ranges from Minnesota and southern Ontario to Oklahoma and North Carolina, reaching the Atlantic Coast from Newfoundland to Maryland. The habitat consists of wetlands.

The length of the forewings is 15–19 mm. Adults are dull brown, red-brown, or yellow-brown in color. Adults are on wing from May to October in the south and from June to August in Quebec and farther north. There is one generation in the north and there are two generations in the south.

The larvae feed on Rumex and possibly Polygonum species. They bore into the stems and roots of their host plant.

References

Moths described in 1852
Hadeninae